Over Holluf is a small town in Odense Municipality on the island of Funen, Denmark. It is located in Fraugde Parish approximately 8 kilometers southeast of the Odense city center. As of 1. January 2022, Over Holluf had a population of 1,548. The area is most renowned as the birthplace of author Morten Korch in 1876.

History
In 1484, Holluf was an estate under cultivation by Jørgen Marsvin. References to two separate farms under the names Upper and Lower Holluf are first noted in 1500. In the early 1530s the area was owned and operated by the Dalum Monastery before it returned to private ownership. By 1664, the area consisted of 6 residences and 11 farms. By 1844, the area consisted entirely of private lands.

Further reading
 Dalsgaard, Ellen.(1984) Fraugde Kirkes Historie, Fraugde Parish Authority.
 Knudsen, Lise Gerda med flere. (2005) Historisk alts Fyn, Fynske minder 2005, pages 11-19. Odense City Museum.
 Etting, Vivian. (1998) Hvad skal vi med Kulturmiljøet? page 1-6. Ministry of the Interior.

References

Odense
Cities and towns in the Region of Southern Denmark
Odense Municipality